The following is a list of committees in the States General of the Netherlands.

House of Representatives

House of Representatives Committee on Foreign Affairs

 Bold signifies the Chair of the Committee
 Italics signifies the main spokesperson for their respective parties

Administration 
 Justice and Security
 Interior
 Kingdom Relations
 Petitions committee
 Intelligence and Security Services
 TCEWPE

Finance and Economy 
 Economic Affairs and Climate Policy
 Finance

Education 
 Education, Culture and Science

Spatial Planning 
 Agriculture, Nature and Food Quality
 Infrastructure and Water Management

Social Issues 
 Social Affairs and Employment
 Health, Welfare and Sport

International Affairs 
 Foreign Affairs
 Defence
 European Affairs
 Foreign Trade and Development Cooperation
 Contact group Belgium
 Contact group Germany
 Contact group France
 Contact group United Kingdom

The Organisation of the House of Representatives 
 Building advice committee
 Presidium
 Credentials committee
 Procedure Committee

Delegations 
 Parliamentary Assembly of the Union for the Mediterranean Region
 The Benelux Interparliamentary Consultative Council
 Dutch parliamentary delegation to the NATO Assembly
 Dutch Group at the Interparliamentary Union
 Dutch parliamentary delegation to the OSCE
 Dutch parliamentary delegation to the Council of Europe
 Interparliamentary committee on the Dutch Language Union

Senate
 The Interior and the High Councils of State / General Affairs and King's House
 Foreign Affairs, Defence and Development Cooperation
 Committees for the Credentials
 Economic Affairs
 European Affairs
 Finance
 Immigration & Asylum / JBZ Council
 Infrastructure, the Environment and Spatial Planning
 Kingdom Relations
 Education, Culture and Science
 Political preparation group IPC Article 13
 Political preparation group IPC COSAC
 Political preparation group IPC Energy
 Political preparation group IPC GBVB
 Political preparation group IPC Human Trafficking
 Social Affairs and Employment
 Security and Justice
 Petitions
 Health, Welfare and Sports

External links
House of Representatives - Committees index
Senate Committees 

Parliamentary committees
States General of the Netherlands